Sphodromantis fenestrata is a species of praying mantis found in Ethiopia, Kenya, Somalia, Sudan, and Tanzania.

See also
African mantis
List of mantis genera and species

References

fenestrata
Mantodea of Africa
Insects described in 1912